Several ships have borne the name Solent, after the stretch of water between the Isle of Wight and mainland England, including:

 , two vessels of the British Royal Navy:
 , a War Department submarine mining vessel Solent, built in 1885, transferred to the Navy as a storeship in 1907, and sold later that year
 , an S-class submarine, launched in 1944 and broken up in 1961

 Three passenger paddle steamers of the London and South Western Railway, providing ferry services to the Isle of Wight:
 
 
 

 Two passenger-cargo liners of the Royal Mail Steam Packet Company used on inter-island West Indies services:
 , a 2230 grt paddle steamer, built by T & J White at Cowes and broken up in 1869
 , a 1908 grt screw steamer, built by Oswald Mordaunt and Co at Woolston and broken up in 1909

References

Ship names